Aune is a Norwegian surname. Notable people with the surname include:

Alison Aune, American professor and artist
Anders John Aune (1923-2011), Norwegian politician
Ashley Aune, American businesswoman and politician
Austin Aune (born 1993), American gridiron football player
Espen Aune (born 1982), Norwegian strongman
David Aune (born 1939), American scholar
Eira Aune (born 1997), Norwegian handball player
Hans A. Aune (1878-1931), American educator, businessman, and politician
Helge Aune (born 1973), retired Norwegian football defender 
Ingrid Aune (1985-2019), Norwegian politician
Karin Aune (born 1975), Swedish road cyclist 
Leif Jørgen Aune (1925-2019), Norwegian economist and politician
Malin Aune (born 1995), Norwegian handball player
Nathan Aune (born 1996), American footballer
Pål Trøan Aune (born 1992), Norwegian cross-country skier
Therese Aune (born 1987), Norwegian musician and songwriter
Tom Freddy Aune (born 1970), Norwegian footballer and coach

Norwegian-language surnames